Rotylenchus robustus (Thorne's lance nematode) is a plant pathogenic nematode infecting lettuce.

References

External links 
 Nemaplex, University of California - Rotylenchus robustus

Tylenchida
Plant pathogenic nematodes
Lettuce diseases